Alappuzha or Alleppey is the administrative headquarters of Alappuzha district in state of Kerala, India. The Backwaters of Alappuzha  are one of the most popular tourist attractions in India which attracts millions of domestic and international tourists.

Alleppey is a city and a municipality in Kerala with an urban population of 174,164 and ranks third among the districts in literacy rate in the state. In 2016, the Centre for Science and Environment rated Alappuzha as the cleanest town in India. Alappuzha is considered to be the oldest planned city in this region and the lighthouse built on the coast of the city is the first of its kind along the Laccadive Sea coast.

The city is 55 km from Kochi and 155 km north of Thiruvananthapuram. A town with canals, backwaters, beaches, and lagoons, Alappuzha was described by George Curzon, Viceroy of India at the start of the 20th century, as the "Venice of the East." Hence, it is known as the "Venetian Capital" of Kerala.

It is an important tourist destination in India.  It connects Kumarakom and Cochin to the North and Kollam to the South. It is also the access point for the annual Nehru Trophy Boat Race, held on the Punnamada Lake, near Alappuzha, on the second Saturday of August every year. This is amongst the most popular and competitive boat races in India.

Alappuzha was home to the Punnapra-Vayalar uprising against the Separate American Model independent Travancore proposal and also the revolt against the Feudal raj. Over 200 Communist party members were killed by the army of the Diwan at Punnapra. Coir is the most important commodity manufactured in Alappuzha. The Coir Board was established by the Central Government under the provisions of the Coir Industry Act, 1955. A Central Coir Research Institute is located at Kalavoor.

Etymology 

Carved out of the erstwhile Kottayam and Kollam districts,  Alappuzha district was formed on 17 August 1957 and consisted initially of seven taluks, namely Cherthala, Ambalappuzha, Kuttanad, Chengannur, Karthikappally and Mavelikkara.

The name Ᾱlappuzha is a toponym. ‘Ᾱlayam’ means ‘home’ and ‘puzha’, according to Dr. Herman Gundert's dictionary, means ‘watercourse’ or ‘river’. The name refers to the network of waterways and backwaters in Alappuzha and its surrounding areas. The district is bounded on the north by Kochi and Kanayannur taluks of Ernakulam district, on the east by Vaikom, Kottayam and Changanassery taluks of Kottayam district and Thiruvalla and Kozhencherry taluks of Pathanamthitta district, on the South by Kunnathur and Karunagappally taluks of Kollam district and on the west by Laccadive Sea.

The present Alappuzha district comprises six taluks, namely Cherthala, Ambalappuzha, Kuttanad, Karthikappally, Chengannur and Mavelikkara. Its headquarters is located at Alappuzha.

History 

Kuttanad, the rice bowl of Kerala, with its paddy fields, small streams and canals with lush green coconut palms, was well known even from the early periods of the Sangam age.  
 
Literary works such as Unnuneeli Sandesam give some insight into the ancient period of this district. Archaeological antiquities, such as the stone inscriptions, historical monuments found in the temples, churches, and rock-cut caves, also emphasise the historic importance of Alappuzha District. 

Christianity had a foothold in this district, even from the 1st century AD. The church located at Kokkamangalam was one of the seven churches founded by St Thomas, one of the twelve disciples of Jesus Christ. It is generally believed that he landed at Maliankara in Muziris Port, presently known as Cranganore or Kodungallur, in 52 AD and preached Christianity in South India.

The district flourished in religion and culture under the second Chera Empire, during 9th to 12th centuries AD. The literary work, `Ascharya Choodamani`, a Sanskrit drama written by Sakthibhadran, a scholar of Chengannur, enables us to know many pertinent facts. Further, the temple on Lord Ayyappan, in Mukkal vattam near Muhamma in Alappuzha District, is called Cheerappanchira, for the Kalari from which Lord Ayyappa learnt his martial arts. A recent album by P. Unni Krishnan on Lord Ayyappa, titled 'Sabarimalai Va Charanam Solli Va', has songs illustrating the history of this temple and Lord Ayyappa's stay here before he went to conquer the Mahishi Demon.

Since landing in Calicut in 1498, the Portuguese started playing an influential role in Alappuzha. They began by spreading Catholicism and converting already existing Christians into Catholics. St Andrew's Basilica was built during this period. 

In the 17th century, as the Portuguese power declined, the Dutch gained a predominant position in the principalities of this district. They built many factories and warehouses for storing pepper and ginger, relying on several treaties signed between the Dutch and the Rajas of Purakkad, Kayamkulam and Karappuram. In course of time they also delved into the political and cultural affairs of the district. At that time Maharaja Marthanda Varma (1706–1758), who was the 'Maker of modern Travancore', intervened in the political affairs of those princedoms.

Travancore Dewan Ramayyan Dalawa (d. 1756) resided in Mavelikkara where he had a palace built by Marthanda Varma. After the death of his wife, Ramayyan consorted with a Nair lady from Mavelikkara of the Edassery family (PGN Unnithan, a member of this family, later became the last Dewan of Travancore in 1947). After his death Ramayyan's descendants left Travancore to settle in Pudukkottai in Tamil Nadu. His Nair consort was given gifts and presents and special allowances from the Travancore government in recognition of his services to the state while his own descendants were bestowed with the honorific title of Dalawa.

In the 19th century the district saw progress in many spheres. One of the five subordinate courts opened in the state in connection with the reorganization of the judicial system by Colonel George Monro was located at Mavelikkara. The first post office and first telegraph office in the former Travancore state were established in this district. The first manufacturing factory for the coir mats was established in 1859. In 1894 the city Improvement Committee was set up.

The district played a role in the freedom struggle of the country. The struggles of Punnapra and Vayalar in 1946 arrayed the people against Sir C. P. Ramaswami Iyer, who was Dewan of Travancore. This led to Ramaswami Iyer's exit from the political scene of Travancore. A popular Ministry was formed in Travancore on 24 March 1948 after India's independence.  Travancore and Cochin states were integrated on 1 July 1949. This arrangement continued until the formation of Kerala State on 1 November 1956, under the States Reorganisation Act 1956. The district came into existence as a separate administrative unit on 1 August 1957.

Raja Kesavadas and Alappuzha 
Raja Kesavadas, the Dewan of Travancore during the reign of Dharma Raja Karthika Thirunal Rama Varma in 18th century was well known for his planning skills and administrative acumen. He was the master mind in developing the Alappuzha town.

He found Alappuzha as an ideal location and constructing a well planned port city in Travancore. Alappuzha was most suitable, because of the geographical and oceanic reasons. He constructed two parallel canals for bringing goods to port from backwaters and offered infrastructural facilities to merchants and traders from Surat, Mumbai and Kutch to start industrial enterprises, trading, and cargo centres. Alappuzha attained progress and became the financial nerve centre of Travancore during his time. The port was opened in 1762, mainly for the export of coir-matting and coir-yarn. Kesavadas built three ships for trade with Calcutta and Bombay, and alleppey afforded a convenient depot for the storage and disposal of goods produce in the east.

Geography 

The average elevation is 
The city of Alappuzha is crisscrossed by a system of canals, which is a part of the National Waterway 3.

The district is a sandy strip of land intercepted by lagoons, rivers and canals. There are no mountains or hills in the district except some scattered hillocks lying between Bharanikkavu and Chengannur blocks in the eastern portion of the district. There are no forest area in this district.

Alappuzha is bounded by the Laccadive Sea on its west. The town has a network of lakes, lagoons and fresh water rivers. The richness of the coastal Alappuzha waters is expressed annually in the blooming and consequent deposit of a huge quantity of fishes and prawns on the Alappuzha coast called ‘[Chakara]’. This annual shifting of sandbank appears during the post-monsoon period and contributes to the local economy and is a festive season for the people of Kerala. The annual floods rejuvenate and cleanse the soil and water due to which there is abundance of marine life like prawns, lobsters, fishes, turtles and other flora in the sea.

The backwaters and wetlands host thousands of migrant common teal, ducks and cormorants every year who reach here from long distances. A major feature of the area is the region called Kuttanad, the 'granary of Kerala'. Kuttanad is also known as the rice bowl of Kerala and is one of the few places in the world where farming is done below sea level. The paddy fields lie about 0.6 to 2 m below mean sea level.

Climate 
Owing to its proximity to the sea, the climate of Alappuzha is humid and hot during the summer, although it remains fairly cool and pleasant during the months of October and November. The average monthly temperature is 27 degree Celsius. The district gets the benefit of two seasonal monsoons, as in other parts of the state. Alappuzha town experiences a long monsoon season with heavy showers as both the Southwest and Northeast monsoon influences the weather of Alappuzha. The South-west monsoon affects the climate in the months from June to September. On the other hand, the North-east monsoon brings rain from October to November. The average rainfall received by the region is 2763 mm.

Demographics 

According to the 2011 census, Alappuzha Municipality+Outgrowths had a population of 240,991 with 116,439 men and 124,552 women. There were 22,361 persons under six years of age. The literacy rate of Alappuzha city stands at 95.81% with 209,201 literates where 101,927 are males (97.3%) and 107,274 are females (94.43%). Alappuzha had a sex ratio of 1070.

The population is predominantly Hindus, and there are sizeable numbers of Christians and Muslims. The most widely spoken language is Malayalam, although many people speak Konkani.

The standard dialect of Malayalam spoken is Central Travancore dialect. Konkani is a language that is spoken in the Konkan region. During the Portuguese and Dutch invasions of the 16th and 18th centuries, many Konkanis migrated southwards to Thuravoor, Cherthala and Alappuzha in the state of Travancore as well as other places in Kerala like Cochin, Kodungalloor, and Kollam. A majority of these people got settled in Alappuzha.

Economy 

The economy of the district is based on agriculture and marine products. The agricultural activities predominantly revolve around the Kuttanad region, the rice bowl of Kerala. Though the district is industrially backward, some traditional industries based on coir and coir products, marine products, handlooms, different types of handicrafts, toddy tapping have been active from the very early times. The district is known as the traditional home of coir industry in Kerala.

The availability of raw materials and the existence of backwaters and canals suitable for the getting of green husk and accessibility of transportation are the main factors of the development of this industry. Arabs had carried on trade in coir products from very ancient period. The manufacture of mats and mattings were first introduced in 1859 by James Durragh.

The Coir Board was established by the Central Government under the provisions of the Coir Industry Act in 1955. A coir research institute functions at Kalavoor. The National Coir Training and Designing Centre was established at Alappuzha in 1965.

Coir is the most important commodity manufactured in Alappuzha, Kayamkulam, Kokkothamangalam, Komalapuram, Mannancherry, Muhamma and Vayalar. Coir products are available in Cherthala and Mannancherry, lime shell in Arookutty and Kodamthuruth, plywood in Chengannur, Keltron controls in Aroor, potassium chloride in Mavelikkara, and coconuts and coconut oil in Thanneermukkom. Other important commodities manufactured in these towns are copra, glass, mats and matches.

In recent times, tourism has become a major source of revenue. This is mainly due to the presence of houseboats that provide the tourists with a view of the scenic backwaters of the town. Another reason is the proximity to other tourist spots like Munnar, Varkala, Alappuzha and Wayanad. Furthermore, as per the Tourist Statstics by Kerala Tourism, there is a 74.55% increase in tourists arriving in Alleppey between 2021 and 2020 while the average for the entire state stands at 51.09%.

Backwater paddy cultivation 

The major occupation in Alappuzha is farming. The Rice Bowl of Kerala, Kuttanadu is located in Alappuzha. Large farming areas near Vembanad Lake were reclaimed from the lake. In earlier times, the reclamation was done mainly from the shallow part of the Vembanad Lake or from the periphery of river Pamba. These reclamations constituted small areas of paddy fields called Padsekharam. The bailing out of water from those fields were done manually using water wheels (Chakram). Gradually the manual method used for bailing out of water gave way to steam engines.

Three stages can be identified in the reclamation of lands from the Vembanad Lake. In the first stage it was carried out by private entrepreneurs without any financial support from the part of the government. The Pattom Proclamation, made by the Travancore Kingdom in the year 1865, gave a great boost to the reclamation activities between 1865 and 1890. During this period de-watering of the polders were done manually, using waterwheels, restricting large-scale reclamations. Only about 250 hectares of land were reclaimed during this period. Venadu Lake and Madathil Lake that were reclaimed during this period are considered as the first Kayal Nilam (lake-reclaimed land) which were reclaimed from Vembanad Lake. The pioneering reclamation activity of lake-reclamation and cultivation was made by Pallithanam Luca Matthai. The period between 1865 and 1890 is usually considered as the first phase of lake-cultivation.

The introduction of kerosene engines for dewatering resulted in the reclamation of wider areas of the lake for cultivation. It made the farmers consider venturing into the deeper parts of the lake. During the period between 1898 and 1903, reclamation activity was led by Pallithanam Luca Mathai (alias Pallithanathu Mathaichen) who reclaimed the Cherukara and Pallithanam Moovayiram kayals.

The second phase (1890 to 1903) of reclamation activities came to a halt because of the ban on lake reclamation imposed by the Madras Government in 1903. Cherukali Kayal, Rama Rajapuram Kayal, Aarupanku Kayal, Pantharndu Panku Kayal, and Mathi Kayal were the other major reclamations during this period.

In 1912, the Madras Government approved a proposal from the Travencore Government for further reclamations in three stages. Under this reclamation scheme areas were notified for reclamation in blocks each named by an alphabet letter. Out of the total area of 19,500 acres of reclaimed land 12,000 acres were reclaimed between 1913 and 1920. The reclamations between 1914 and 1920 are known as new reclamations, which were carried out in three periods. In the first period Blocks A to G measuring 6300 Acres were reclaimed. C Block, D Block (Attumukham Aarayiram (Attumuttu Kayal), Thekke Aarayiram and Vadakke Aarayiram) and E Block (Erupathinalayiram Kayal) F Block (Judge's Aarayiram Kayal) and G Block (Kochu Kayal) are the major reclamations during this period. During the second period of new reclamation, blocks H to N measuring 3600 acres were reclaimed. During the third period of new reclamation, R Block measuring 1,400 acres were reclaimed.

Due to the steep decline in the price of rice during 1920 to 1940, the reclamation activities became sluggish, but they gained momentum again in the early 1940s. During this period, in order to increase the agricultural output, government initiated a Grow More Food campaign and provided incentives to encourage new reclamations. The advent of electric motors made the reclamation easier, cheaper and less risky as compared to the earlier periods. The last tract of the reclamations namely Q, S and T block were made during this period.

Transport

Road

National highways 
Nation Highway 66, connecting Panvel to Kanyakumari runs through the Alappuzha city centre. The Alappuzha Bypass was built to route the national highway around city centers between Kommady and Kalarkode. National Highway 66 connects Alappuzha city to other major cities like Mumbai, Udupi, Mangalore, Kannur, Kozhikode, Ernakulam, Kollam and Trivandrum. There is a plan to upgrade State Highway 11 to a national highway in order to help connect Alappuzha to Kodaikanal as part of promoting the coastal-hill tourism project.

State highways 

There are eight state highways in Alappuzha district, of which three of them originates from Alappuzha town. State Highway 11 starts from Kalarcode and ends at Perunna. This highway is locally known as AC road (Alappuzha-Changanassery road) and it covers a distance of 24.2 km. It is an important road which connects Alappuzha town with Kottayam district. Stateway High 40 is an interstate highway in Alappuzha district which connects Alappuzha town with Madurai in Tamil Nadu. It is the only interstate highway in Alappuzha district. State Highway 66 originates from Alappuzha town and terminates at Thoppumpady.

There are two bus terminals are situated in Alappuzha town, one for KSRTC buses (situated near state water transport corporation headquarters, boat jetty road) and the V K soman memorial municipal bus stand for private buses and interstate bound contract carriage buses (situated near Vazhicherry). KSRTC buses connect Alappuzha with, among other places, Banglore, Mysore, Kollur, Mangalore, Chennai, Coimbatore, Trivandrum, and Thiruvalla. SETC and TNSTC ply many daily services to the city. Karnataka State Road Transport Corporation have two daily services originating from Alappuzha.

Water 
The presence of a lot of backwaters and canals makes water transport a popular means of transport. National Waterway-3 passes through Alappuzha. There is a SWTD boat jetty in the city that lies opposite to the KSRTC bus stand. It is served by boat services to  Kottayam and Kollam cities besides other small towns and jetties. Availing an SWTD boat is a cheaper alternative to houseboats for visiting tourists.

Rail 
Alappuzha is linked by Ernakulam–Kayamkulam coastal railway line and connects to cities like Trivandrum, Kollam, Cochin, Coimbatore, Chennai, Delhi, Bokaro and Mumbai. A total of four trains originate from Alappuzha to cities like Kannur, Chennai, Dhanbad and Tatanagar. There are a lot of local trains running throughout the day, which connect Alappuzha to other towns near by. Since Alappuzha is a prime destination, trains from important cities like Delhi, Chandigarh, Hyderabad, Bangalore, Mangalore, Kozhikode and Amritsar pass through this station.

Air 

Thiruvananthapuram International Airport,  to the South, is the other airport that links the district with other countries. International tourists use these airports to reach Alappuzha. The other nearest airports are Calicut and Coimbatore airports. A helipad in the town is reserved for government uses.

Administration and politics 

The two administrative systems prevailing in the district are revenue and local self-government. Under the revenue system, the district is divided into two revenue divisions, six taluks and 91 villages. The two revenue divisions are Alappuzha division comprising Cherthala, Ambalappuzha and Kuttanad taluks consisting of 47 villages and Chengannur division comprising Karthikapally, Chengannur and Mavelikkara taluks consisting of 44 villages. For census purposes, Aroor, Arookutty, Kodamthuruth, Thanneermukkom Vadakku, Thaneermukkam Thekku, Vayalar East and Kokkothamangalam village, except the portions included in Cherthala municipality are treated in the 1981 census as census towns based on the threefold criteria adopted for treating a place as census town.

Under the local self-government system, the district is divided into five statutory towns and development blocks consisting of 71 panchayats. The jurisdiction of a Development Block includes the areas falling in census towns also.

There were nine legislative assembly segments in Alappuzha district for the 2011 Assembly elections. They are Aroor, Cherthala, Alappuzha, Kuttanad, Haripad, Kayamkulam, Mavelikkara and Chengannur.

Alappuzha assembly constituency is part of Alappuzha (Lok Sabha constituency). The other Lok Sabha constituency of the district is Mavelikkara.

Education 

There are schools, computer institutes and colleges all over the district, with nine training schools, 405 lower primary schools, 105 high schools and 87 higher secondary schools.

The first school in Alappuzha, the Church Missionary Society (CMS) School, was established in 1816. The school was established by the Rev. Thomas Norton, the first CMS missionary to India. The school is run by the CSI Christ Church, Alappuzha. The first higher secondary school in Alappuzha was the Leo XIIIth Higher Secondary School, which was opened on 1 June 1889 by Portuguese Bishop John Gomes Pereira of Cochin. The first polytechnic college in Alappuzha was the Carmel Polytechnic College, established by Fr. Gilbert Palaekunnel and it's managed by CMI Congregation. Carmel is the academically top-ranked polytechnic in the state still.

Colleges in Alappuzha offer both graduate and postgraduate courses for their students.

Major college institutes
 College of Engineering, Cherthala 
 Cochin University College of Engineering Kuttanad
 Sanatana Dharma College
 S. D. V. College of Arts and Applied Science
 Sree Narayana College Cherthala-SN College Kanjikkuzhy
 N.S.S. College, Cherthala
 Government College, Ambalappuzha
 College of Engineering and Management, Punnapra
 Mar Gregorios College Punnapra
 College of Engineering Chengannur 
 College of Applied Sciences, Mavelikkara
 Carmel College of Engineering and Technology Alappuzha
 Government T D Medical College, Alappuzha 
 St Joseph's College for Women, Alappuzha 
 St Michael's College, Cherthala
 T. K. Madhava Memorial College 
 St. Aloysius College Edathua
 Bishop Moore College Mavelikkara
 Milad-E-Sherief Memorial College, Kayamkulam (MSM)
 Christian College, Chengannur

Religious buildings/ shrines 

Hindu Temples in Alappuzha (Alleppey)
 Ambalappuzha Sree Krishna Swamy Temple
 Anandeshwaram Mahadeva Temple
 Chakkulathukavu Temple (Bhagavathy Temple)
 Chettikulangara Devi Temple
 Chengannur Mahadeva Temple
 Cheriyanad Sree Balasubrahmanya Swami Temple
 Chunakkara Thiruvairoor Mahadevar Temple
 Haripad Sree Subrahmanya Swamy Temple
 Kanichukulangara Devi Temple
 Kuttikattu Sree Bhadra Kali Devi Temple
 Karthyayani Devi Temple, Cherthala
 Kandiyoor Sree Mahadeva Temple, Mavelikkara
 Karayamvattam Hanuman Temple
 Mannarasala Temple (Sree Nagaraja Temple)
 Maruthorvattom Sri Dhanwanthari Temple, Cherthala
 Mullakkal Rajarajeswari Temple
 Mavelikara Sree Krishna Swamy Temple
 Padanilam Parabrahma Temple, Nooranad
 Thripuliyoor Mahavishnu Temple
 Thrikkunnappuzha Sree Dharmasastha Temple 
 Thrichittatt Maha Vishnu Temple
 Thuravoor Mahakshetram
 Thiruvizha Mahadeva Temple, Cherthala
 Valiyakulangara Devi Temple, Karthikappally
 Vettikodu Sri Nagararaja Temple

Christian churches in Alappuzha (Alleppey)
 St Andrew's Basilica, Arthunkal   
 Ss George/Paul Forane Church) 
 Basilica of St Mary, Champakulam (Chambakulam kalloorkadu Basilica) 
 St Thomas Church, Thumpoly
 Our Lady of Assumption Church, Poomkavu
 St Mary's Forane Church, Pulincunno
 St Mary's Forane Church, Thankey 
 St Mary's Forane Church, Pallipuram 
 Mount Carmel Cathedral Church, Alappuzha
 St Thomas Orthodox Cathedral, Karthikappally

Muslim mosques in Alappuzha (Alleppey)
 Makidusha Jumah Masjid Alappy
 Kizhake Masthan Jumah Masjid
 Padinjaare Jumah Masjid
 Thekke Jumah Masjid
 Kadhar Ali Bava Thykaav Dargah 
 Purakkad Mosque Dargah
 Zilla Court Jumah Makidusha

Sports 

Alappuzha is globally famous for snake boat races, especially the Nehru Trophy Boat Race held in the Punnamada Lake near Alappuzha. In 1952, when Jawaharlal Nehru, the first prime minister of India, visited Kerala, the people of Alleppey decided to give a special entertainment for their prestigious guest and conducted a snake boat race. Nehru got so excited by this event and he jumped into 'Nadubhagam Chundan' (a snake boat), ignoring the security officials. By this excitement of sailing in a snake boat he donated a rolling trophy to be awarded to the winner of the race. Other than this snake boat race cricket, football, basketball and rowing are among the most popular sports in town. In 2015, the Kerala Cricket Association inaugurated the KCA Cricket Stadium Alappuzha, which is an A-class cricket stadium. Another stadium named as EMS Stadium or municipal stadium is under construction as of 2021.

Notable people 

 Thakazhi Sivasankara Pillai - novelist and short story writer, recipient of India's highest literary award, the Jnanpith.
 Vayalar Ramavarma - Malayalam poet and film lyricist
 Arattupuzha Velayudha Panicker - Social reformer in Kerala
 M. G. Sreekumar - musician, singer and music director
 Vayalar Sarath Chandra Varma - poet and lyricist 
 M. K. Sanu – writer, critic and social activist, a permanent member of the International body for Human rights
 Irayimman Thampi -  Carnatic musician as well as a music composer from Kerala
 Kavalam Narayana Panicker - Dramatist,theatre director,poet
 Rajeev Alunkal - lyricist, poet and orator
 S. D. Shibulal - chief executive officer and managing director of Infosys
 Navajyothi Sree Karunakara Guru - founder of Santhigiri Ashram
 P. S. Karthikeyan - former Secretary, S. N. Trust, former Director of SNDP Yogam, former Member of the Legislative Assembly (Aroor), Chief Editor of Dinamani daily
 Joy J. Kaimaparamban - English and Malayalam author
 Itty Achudan - the major contributor of ethno-medical information for the compilation of Hortus Malabaricus
 Eleanour Sinclair Rohde - British gardener and writer on horticulture
 V. P. Sivakumar - short story writer
 Justice C.T.Ravikumar - Supreme Court Judge.
 Kavalam Sreekumar - Classical musician,playback singer,composer

Religion 
 Karunakara Guru - founder of Santhigiri Ashramam
 Palackal Thoma Malpan - founder of the Carmelites of Mary Immaculate
 Mgr. Joseph C. Panjikaran - founder of the Medical Sisters of St. Joseph

 Antony Theodore - Christian educator, poet, social worker
 Saint Kuriakose Elias Chavara - Christian saint

Politics 
 A. K. Antony - three times Chief Minister of Kerala in UDF Ministry, former Indian Defence Minister
 V. S. Achuthanandan - former chief minister of Kerala and one of the most senior communist politicians of India
 Ramesh Chennithala - former Home Minister and Former Leader of the opposition of Kerala, current legislative assembly member of Haripad constituency. 
 Suseela Gopalan- Former Kerala Industries Minister and Communist Leader 
 K. R. Gowri - Revenue Minister in first Kerala LDF ministry, initiated the land reforms in Kerala, Agriculture minister in Kerala UDF Ministry
 Vayalar Ravi - former Home minister of Kerala in UDF Ministry, former Union Cabinet Minister of Overseas Indian Affairs and Minister for Parliamentary Affairs
 C. K. Chandrappan - communist leader and former Member of Parliament
 S. Ramachandran Pillai - Politburo member of the Communist Party of India (Marxist) and General Secretary of All India Kisan Sabha (Peasants Union)
 G. Sudhakaran - member of the Communist Party of India (Marxist) and former PWD minister of Kerala
 P. Parameswaran - Director of Bharatheeya Vichara Kendram; philosopher

Cinema 
 Sreekumaran Thampi - lyricist, director, producer and screenwriter in Malayalam cinema
 Jomon T. John - Indian cinematographer
 Ratheesh - Malayalam film actor
 Kunchacko - Indian film producer and director
 Nedumudi Venu - Malayalam film actor.
 Fazil - Malayalam film director
 Kunchacko Boban - Malayalam film actor
 Riaz M T - Malayalam film actor
 Fahadh Faasil - Malayalam film actor
 Jagannatha Varma - Kathakali artist, actor in Malayalam film and serial
 Ashokan - Malayalam film actor
 Rajan P. Dev – Malayalam film actor and drama/theatre person
 S. L. Puram Sadanandan - Malayalam playwright and film scriptwriter
 Chelangatt Gopalakrishnan - writer and film critic
 Radhika (Malayalam actress) - Malayalam film actress
 Navodaya Appachan - Malayalam movie producer and businessman
 Jijo Punnoose - film director
 Padmarajan - film director
 Narendra Prasad - film actor, writer and critic
 KPAC Lalitha - Malayalam film actress
 Beeyar Prasad - Indian Malayalam lyricist and poet
 Madhu Muttom - Screenwriter,Screenwriter of Manichitrathazhu,  Kakkothikkavile Appooppan Thaadikal 
 Samantha Ruth Prabhu- Actress

Sport 
 Thomas J. Fenn - former Kerala State and International basketball player and referee
 Prasanth Parameswaran - Kerala first class cricketer (Indian Premier League and Royal Challengers Bangalore player)
 Saji Thomas - sportsman and Arjuna awardee

See also 
 Alappuzha East
 Alappuzha West
 Ernakulam-Kayamkulam coastal railway line
 KCA Cricket Stadium, Alappuzha
 List of people from Alappuzha
 Technical Higher Secondary School, Cherthala, Pallippuram
 Travancore Labour Association

References

External links 

 
 Kerala State Water Transport Department official website
 Official website of Alappuzha District

 Backwaters of Alappuzha
 Venice of the East, Alleppey

 
Cities and towns in Alappuzha district
Populated coastal places in India
Port cities in India